Réalités was a French monthly of the post World War II era which commenced publication in February 1946, flourishing during the Trente Glorieuses, a period of optimism, recovery and prosperity in France after the austerity of Occupation, ceasing in 1978 in France, although the later US edition continued until 1981. Its articles ranged across French culture, economy and politics, and featured profusely illustrated stories of interest to tourists, especially those traveling to French colonies.

Editorial objectives
The magazine's founders were entrepreneurs Humbert Frerejean (1914-2001) and Didier Rémon (1922–), the editor Alfred Max, and first artistic director Alfred Brandler, replaced in 1950 by Albert Gilou. They proclaimed an intention to produce a high-class, profusely-illustrated publication which was to be outward-looking, an 'observatory on the world', after the years of Occupation during which information about the rest of the world was restricted. In a mission statement they expressed interest in leading readers to discover "how the other lives, whether a thousand kilomètres away or close by, how they eat, dress, work, love, entertain". ("Comment vit l'autre, à des milleurs de kilomètres ou à proximité, comment il mange, s'habille, travail, aime, s'amuse.").

In November 1946 Didier Rémon created Société d'études et de publications économiques (SEPE) (Society of studies and business publications), registering Réalités as a press and publishing group, and which from 1960 becomes part of the Hachette group. From 1947 the magazine included a literary supplement, with theatre plays, novels, or topical documents, and other supplements and special issues devoted to visual arts, fashion, business affairs, children and youth, followed. In November 1956, after 130 issues, the title merged with Femina-Illustration founded by Hélène Gordon-Lazareff. Its offices were then installed in the L'Illustration building, at 13 rue Saint-Georges (Paris). Until May 1964, the magazine was called Réalités Femina-Illustration, having absorbed the old Monde illustré in the process. In June 1964, Réalités resumed its original title and came under the direction of Robert Salmon. After number 390, the title merged in December 1978 with Le Spectacle du monde.

Readership and influence
Colourful, slick and glossy, roughly A4 in size (slightly larger than 8 ½” x 11”), and costing 150 francs per issue (approximately the value of $US25-$US30 in 2015), Réalités catered to the sophisticated and wealthy reader. In its early years at least, on average, 160,000 copies were distributed each month, mostly by subscription. Its content included stories on the economy and politics alongside articles of interest to tourists and on French culture.

The publisher of Réalités, the Société d'études et publications économiques, received funding from the 'Mission France' initiative of the Marshall Plan. It therefore also served to promote American culture and political influence in France and Europe, which was prompted by a pervasive American francophilia and perception of France as a frontier against Nazi resurgence and communist influence. Copies were circulated in Hungary and Czechoslovakia. From as early as 1952 the magazine was also issued in the UK in an English language edition; additionally, there was an edition for the United States, Réalités in America (c.1949–1974, later relaunched in January 1979 as Réalités but ceasing publication again in 1981) and in 1971 a Japanese-language version was launched.

Photography
Photography was given central place in the magazine under art director Albert Gilou. In 1949, photographs replaced the hand-drawn illustration which had hitherto appeared on each cover of Réalités. Covers were devoted to photos which would generate surprise, intrigue or mystery, but not shock or horror. All sorts of images were employed but the dominant genre, at least through the early years, was humanist photography, in particular that of staffers Édouard Boubat and Jean-Philippe Charbonnier, espousing the optimistic  values of the contemporary exhibition The Family of Man in which both exhibited. An emphasis on photography helped promote the reputation of the publication. Among the photographers (of whom, after 1950, Édouard Boubat, Jean-Philippe Charbonnier, Gilles Ehrmann and Jean-Louis Swiners became salaried employees) were contributors Émile Savitry,  Henri Cartier-Bresson, Robert Doisneau, René Burri, Edward Steichen, Robert Capa, William Klein, Richard Avedon, Irving Penn. At first each issue carried sixty pictures in black and white, though the magazine printed colour photographs from 1950. Then, from the mid sixties, most images were in colour, almost exclusively so from the late sixties. Photo essays often extended over twenty pages. Edouard Boubat, who was on staff 1951–1965, described the experience of working for Réalités: 
 "It was beautiful, and very educational for us, really exciting in that we were not necessarily sent to the "hotspots" of the world, [in fact] sometimes going where nothing was happening, and there's nothing to grab. Then one really understands the reality of a country, of a situation. Escaping the news, or what we call the news, and is often a tragic smokescreen that hides the deeper reality, it's an opportunity.".

Cessation
Réalités magazine was most influential between the years 1950 and 1970, employing a journalistic style of long articles associated with pictorial illustration which is now generally replaced by other media. Its last French edition was published in December 1978 with the number 390, and it was then absorbed by Le Spectacle du Monde. The US edition was however relaunched in January 1979, although it only lasted two years.

References

External links
 Sample covers of Réalités magazine (English language edition)
 Article topics in U.S. and French editions of Réalités - arranged by issue date

1946 establishments in France
1978 disestablishments in France
Anti-communist works
Defunct literary magazines published in France
French-language magazines
French photographers
Magazines established in 1946
Magazines disestablished in 1978
Monthly magazines published in France
Photojournalistic magazines